Grammostola is a genus of South American tarantulas that was first described in text by Eugène Louis Simon in 1892. These medium- to large-sized spiders are native to tropical South America, and are usually brown in color, with pinkish or orangish-red hairs. The very docile Chilean rose tarantulas (Grammostola rosea and Grammostola porteri) are popular as a beginner's spider among tarantula enthusiasts.

Grammostola as a pet
The Chilean rose tarantula (Grammostola rosea) is a common pet, as its behavior is generally docile and its venom is very mild. It needs to be kept dry and dislikes being wet (its natural habitat is one of the driest deserts on earth). If the substrate is too wet, it will stand "on tiptoes" in discomfort, or climb the sides of its enclosure, risking fall and injury. It feeds on other invertebrates. Its attributes and care are similar to those of its relative, the Chaco golden-knee tarantula (Grammostola pulchripes).

Species
 it contains twenty species, found in South America:
Grammostola actaeon (Pocock, 1903) – Brazil, Uruguay
Grammostola alticeps (Pocock, 1903) – Uruguay
Grammostola andreleetzi Vol, 2008 – Uruguay
Grammostola anthracina (C. L. Koch, 1842) – Brazil, Uruguay, Paraguay, Argentina
Grammostola borelli (Simon, 1897) – Paraguay
Grammostola burzaquensis Ibarra, 1946 – Argentina
Grammostola chalcothrix Chamberlin, 1917 – Argentina
Grammostola diminuta Ferretti, Pompozzi, González & Pérez-Miles, 2013 – Argentina
Grammostola doeringi (Holmberg, 1881) – Argentina
Grammostola gossei (Pocock, 1899) – Argentina
Grammostola grossa (Ausserer, 1871) – Brazil, Paraguay, Uruguay, Argentina
Grammostola iheringi (Keyserling, 1891) – Brazil
Grammostola inermis Mello-Leitão, 1941 – Argentina
Grammostola mendozae (Strand, 1907) – Argentina
Grammostola porteri (Mello-Leitão, 1936) – Chile
Grammostola pulchra Mello-Leitão, 1921 – Brazil
Grammostola pulchripes (Simon, 1891) (type) – Paraguay, Argentina
Grammostola quirogai Montes de Oca, D'Elía & Pérez-Miles, 2016 – Brazil, Uruguay
Grammostola rosea (Walckenaer, 1837) – Bolivia, Chile, Argentina
Grammostola subvulpina (Strand, 1906) – South America
Grammostola vachoni Schiapelli & Gerschman, 1961 – Argentina

In synonymy

Transferred to other genera 
Grammostola familiaris (Bertkau, 1880) → Homoeomma familiare

Nomen dubium 
Grammostola monticola (Strand, 1907) - Bolivia

Gallery

See also
 List of Theraphosidae species

References

External links
  – includes Grammostola species
 LiveScience Wild Tarantula Eats a Foot-Long Snake in a First

Theraphosidae
Spiders of South America
Theraphosidae genera
Taxa named by Eugène Simon